Jim Carrey's career, over the course of many decades, has allowed him to achieve many awards.

Major associations

British Academy Film Awards
0 wins of 1 nomination

Golden Globe Awards
2 wins of 7 nominations

Grammy Awards
0 wins of 1 nomination

Screen Actors Guild Awards
0 wins of 1 nomination

Audience awards

Golden Schmoes awards
0 wins of 1 nomination

MTV Movie & TV Awards
11 wins of 25 nominations

Nickelodeon Kids' Choice Awards
6 wins of 15 nominations

People's Choice awards
4 wins of 8 nominations

Teen Choice awards
5 wins of 17 nominations

Critics and association awards

Award Circuit Community awards 
0 wins of 5 nominations

Boston Society of Film Critics awards
1 win of 1 nomination

Chicago Film Critics Association awards
0 wins of 2 nominations

Critics Choice Association awards
1 win of 2 nominations

Dallas–Fort Worth Film Critics Association awards
1 win of 1 nomination

International Cinephile Society awards 
1 win of 1 nomination

International Online Cinema awards 
1 win of 1 nomination

London Critics Circle Film awards
1 win of 2 nominations

Online Film & Television Association awards 
0 wins of 7 nominations

Online Film Critics Society awards
0 wins of 2 nominations

San Diego Film Critics Society awards
1 win of 1 nomination

Toronto Film Critics Association awards
0 wins of 1 nomination

Washington DC Area Film Critics Association awards 
0 wins of 1 nomination

Film festival awards

ShoWest Convention awards 
2 wins of 2 nominations

US Comedy Arts Festival awards 
1 win of 1 nomination

International awards

American Comedy awards
0 wins of 5 nominations

Canadian Comedy awards
0 wins of 2 nominations

CinEuphoria awards 
1 win of 1 nomination

Empire awards
0 wins of 2 nominations

Italian Online Movie awards 
0 wins of 1 nomination

Jupiter awards
0 win of 1 nomination

MTV Movie awards, Mexico
1 win of 1 nomination

Order of Arts and Letters awards, France 
1 win of 1 nomination

Russian National Movie awards
0 wins of 2 nominations

Miscellaneous awards

Blockbuster Entertainment awards
4 wins of 6 nominations

Cinema Eye Honors awards 
1 win of 1 nomination

Gold Derby awards
0 wins of 2 nominations

Golden Raspberry awards
0 wins of 2 nominations

MovieGuide awards 
1 win of 2 nominations

MTV Video Music awards
0 wins of 1 nomination

Satellite awards
0 wins of 2 nominations

Saturn awards
0 wins of 3 nominations

The Stinkers Bad Movie awards 
0 wins of 2 nominations

TV Land awards
1 win of 2 nominations

Village Voice Film Poll awards
0 wins of 1 nomination

The Webby awards
1 win of 1 nomination

See also

Jim Carrey
Jim Carrey filmography

References

External links 
 

Carrey, Jim
Carrey, Jim